Ghana Movie Awards is an annual film award to recognise excellence in the Ghanaian film industry. The first edition was held on 25 December 2010 at the Accra International Conference Center. It’s only in 2017 that the ceremony wasn’t held due to the franchise being given to Zylofon media that year. The Award Sheme was founded by Ghanaian actor Fred Nuamah in 2009.

Ceremonies
2010 Ghana Movie Awards
2011 Ghana Movie Awards
2012 Ghana Movie Awards
2013 Ghana Movie Awards
2014 Ghana Movie Awards
2015 Ghana Movie Awards
2016 Ghana Movie Awards
2019 Ghana Movie Awards
2020 Ghana Movie Awards

Categories
The following are the categories as of 2015

References

 
2010 establishments in Ghana
Annual events in Ghana
Awards established in 2010
Ghanaian film awards
Recurring events established in 2010